The Bulgaria national under-18 football team are a feeder team for the main Bulgaria national football team.

Recent results

Players

Current squad
 Squad called up for the friendlies against Ukraine U18 on 21 and 23 March 2019.
Caps and goals updated as of 21 March 2019 after the match against Ukraine U18.

Recent call-ups
The following players have also been called up to the Bulgarian squad within the last 12 months and are still available for selection.

See also
 Bulgaria national football team
 Bulgaria national under-21 football team
 Bulgaria national under-19 football team
 Bulgaria national under-17 football team

References

Bulgaria national football team
European national under-18 association football teams